Arsen Aslanovich Goshokov (born 5 June 1991) is a Russian former footballer.

Career statistics
Statistics accurate as of matches played on 22 August 2014

External links

References

1991 births
Living people
Russian footballers
Russia youth international footballers
Russia under-21 international footballers
PFC Spartak Nalchik players
Russian Premier League players
FC KAMAZ Naberezhnye Chelny players
Association football forwards
FC Ural Yekaterinburg players
Circassian people of Russia